Oberholser's fruit dove (Ptilinopus gularis) is a species of bird in the family Columbidae. It was formerly named P. epius, but it has since been revised to the earlier name P. gularis. It is endemic to Sulawesi.  Its natural habitat is subtropical or tropical moist lowland forests.
It is threatened by habitat loss.

References

Rheindt, F.E., J.A. Eaton, and F. Verbelen 2011. Vocal trait evolution in a geographic leapfrog pattern: speciation in the Maroon-chinned Fruit Dove (Ptilinopus subgularis) complex from Wallacea. Wilson Journal of Ornithology 123: 429–440.

Oberholser's fruit dove
Endemic birds of Sulawesi
Oberholser's fruit dove
Taxa named by Jean René Constant Quoy
Taxa named by Joseph Paul Gaimard
Taxonomy articles created by Polbot
Taxobox binomials not recognized by IUCN